HMS Packington (pennant number: M1214) was a  completed in 1959 by Harland & Wolff for the Royal Navy, but transferred before commissioning to the South African Navy as SAS Walvisbaai. The ship was decommissioned in March 2001 and was sold to the Walt Disney Company in 2003 to be used in the Wes Anderson film The Life Aquatic with Steve Zissou.

Post filming the vessel was sold and was subsequently converted into a private yacht.

Design and description
The Ton-class coastal minesweepers were constructed with wooden hulls and almost all of their structure was made from aluminium to reduce their magnetic signature to aid sweeping magnetic mines. The Tons were powered by two Napier Deltic diesel enginess, each driving one propeller shaft. The Ton-class ships were armed with a single  Bofors and two  Oerlikon light AA guns on a single twin-gun mount.

Construction and career
Packington was launched by Harland and Wolff on 3 July 1958 at their Belfast shipyard. She was transferred to the South African Navy before she was commissioned on 20 September 1959 under the name of SAS Walvisbaai. The ship was retired in March 2001 and sold to the Walt Disney Company in 2003 to be used as the R/V Belafonte in the Wes Anderson film The Life Aquatic with Steve Zissou. 
 
Subsequently, she was sold to a private owner for $350,000. In 2006 she began a lengthy conversion into a yacht in Dubai that saw her engines replaced by a pair of  V-12 Caterpillar 3512B diesel engines, her deck renewed and her interior completely revamped. The work was completed by 2012 and the ship was renamed Mojo.

Citations

References

1958 ships
Cold War minesweepers of the United Kingdom
Maritime history of South Africa
Minesweepers of the South African Navy
Ships built by Harland and Wolff
Ships built in Belfast
Ships of the South African Navy
Ton-class minesweepers of the Royal Navy
Motor yachts